The Miss West Virginia Teen USA competition is the pageant that selects the representative for the state of West Virginia in the Miss Teen USA pageant.  This pageant is independently conducted and produced by Sanders & Associates, Inc., dba- Pageant Associates based in Buckhannon, West Virginia.

Despite a relatively strong start in the 1980s, with two semi-finals finishes, no Miss West Virginia Teen USA placed from 1988 to 2005, when Andrea Turner placed 2nd runner-up to Allie LaForce of Ohio. After this, West Virginia had more success, with more placements in 2007, 2011, 2012, 2013, 2014, 2017 and 2018.

Four Miss West Virginia Teen USA's have also won the Miss West Virginia USA title and competed at Miss USA.

Emma Kitchen of Buckhannon was crowned Miss West Virginia Teen USA 2022 on June 5, 2022 at Virginia Thomas Law Center for the Performing Arts in West Virginia Wesleyan College in Buckhannon. She will represent West Virginia for the title of Miss Teen USA 2022.

Results summary

Placements
1st runners-up: Elizabeth Sabatino (2012)
2nd runners-up: Andrea Turner (2005), Haley Holloway (2013)
4th runners-up: Chelsea Welch  (2007)
Top 10: Jodi Caldwell (1986), Wendy Stephens (1988)
Top 15: Susan Hines King (2011), Lexsey Marrara (2014), Olivia Hutchison (2017), Trinity Tiffany (2018)
West Virginia holds a record of 10 placements at Miss Teen USA.

Awards
Miss Congeniality: Jasmine Lemons of Wheeling (2020)
Miss Photogenic: Cayton Carder of Masontown (2020)

Winners 

1 Age at the time of the Miss Teen USA pageant

External links

References

West Virginia